The Screen Award for Best Music Director is chosen by a distinguished panel of judges from the Indian Bollywood film industry and the winners are announced in January. Frequent winners include A.R. Rahman (5 times), Pritam (4 times),
Shankar–Ehsaan–Loy (3 times), Anu Malik, Rajesh Roshan and Nadeem-Shravan (2 times each). A.R. Rahman (2008–10) has won the award thrice in a row.

Winners

See also
 Screen Awards
 Bollywood
 Cinema of India

Screen Awards
Film awards for Best Music Director